is a Japanese voice actress from Ibaraki Prefecture. She is affiliated with Mausu Promotion.

Roles

Animation
Anime Himitsu no Hanazono (Bunny)
Atashin'chi (Nursing practitioner, Hanae)
Baby and Me (Tadashi Gotō, Taichi Kimura)
Beyblade (Suzuka, Kōji)
B't X (Young Teppei Takamiya)
Captain Tsubasa (Teppei Kisugi)
Clamp School Detectives (Marron)
Cooking Papa (Hiroshi)
Crayon Shin-chan: Shrouded in Mystery! The Flowers of Tenkazu Academy (Homeroom Teacher)
Detective School Q (Sayuri Renjō, Obā-san, Masae Kirihara, wrestler #2, Atsufumi)
Di Gi Charat (Gema)
Dokkiri Doctor (Kyōko Oda)
Doraemon (Nobisuke (second voice), Michibikienzel (second voice))
Figure 17 (Tokio Seizan)
Hamtaro (Kurohamu-kun)
Juuni Senshi Bakuretsu Eto Ranger (Monk)
Magical Angel Sweet Mint (Ian)
Magical Nyan Nyan Taruto (Kakiemori)
Monster (Torahako policewoman)
Ninku (Ken Futoshi, Areku)
Nintama Rantarō (Tensaimaru)
Pokémon (Teru, Tobia)
Ranma ½ (Sayuri)
Reiwa no Di Gi Charat (Gema)
Rerere no Tensai Bakabon (Bakabon)
Secret of Cerulean Sand (Jannu)
Soar High! Isami (Toshi Tsukikage)
The Vision of Escaflowne (Young Van Slanzar de Fanel)
Ultra Nyan: Hoshizora Kara Maiorita Fushigi Neko (1997)  (Ultra Nyan)
Ultra Nyan 2: Happy Daisakusen (movie) (1998) (Ultra Nyan)
Yamato Takeru (Yamato Takeru)
YuYu Hakusho (Ayame, Tsukihito Amanuma)

Video games
Crash Tag Team Racing (Nina Cortex)
Grandia (Guido)
Guardian Heroes (Randy M. Green)

Dubbing roles

Live-action
About a Boy (Marcus Brewer (Nicholas Hoult))
Catch That Kid (Austin (Corbin Bleu))
Child's Play 3 (Ronald Tyler (Jeremy Sylvers))
Die Hard with a Vengeance (Raymond (Aldis Hodge))
Eight Legged Freaks (Mike Parker (Scott Terra))
Final Destination 2 (2006 TV Tokyo edition) (Isabella Hudson (Justina Machado)
Ghost (Rose (Martina Deignan))
The Glass House (Rhett Baker (Trevor Morgan))
A Good Year (Young Max Skinner (Freddie Highmore))
Goosebumps (Gale Cooper (Amy Ryan))
Internal Affairs (Sean Stretch (Elijah Wood))
Jumanji (Young Alan Parrish)
Last Action Hero (Danny Madigan (Austin O'Brien))
Little Women (Amy March (Kirsten Dunst))
The Man Without a Face (Chuck Norstadt)
Mighty Morphin Power Rangers: The Movie (Fred Kelman)
One Hour Photo (Jake Yorkin)
Pecker (Little Chrissy (Lauren Hulsey))
Showgirls (Molly Abrams (Gina Ravera))
Stand by Me (Vern Tessio (Jerry O'Connell))
Super Heroine Chronicle (MOTHER/DIVA)
The Three Stooges (Mother Superior (Jane Lynch)
Wild America (Marshall Stouffer)
Wild Wild West (Rita Escobar (Salma Hayek))

Animation
Code Lyoko (Jeremie Belpois)
Curious George (Steve)
The Rescuers Down Under (Faloo)

References

External links
 
Mausu Promotion

1967 births
Japanese voice actresses
Living people
Voice actresses from Ibaraki Prefecture
20th-century Japanese actresses
21st-century Japanese actresses
Mausu Promotion voice actors